Åsele is a locality and the seat of Åsele Municipality in Västerbotten County, province of Lapland, Sweden with 1,798 inhabitants in 2010. Its elevation is 313 m (1027 ft).

References 

Populated places in Västerbotten County
Populated places in Åsele Municipality
Municipal seats of Västerbotten County
Swedish municipal seats
Lapland (Sweden)